AN/APG-84 Raytheon Advanced Combat Radar (RACR) is an AESA radar developed by Raytheon for F-16, F/A-18 and FA-50 fighter aircraft.

References

External links
 Raytheon Advanced Combat Radar (RACR)

Aircraft radars
Raytheon Company
Military radars of the United States